Nila Djuwita Farid Moeloek (born 11 April 1949) is an Indonesian politician and physician. She was the Minister of Health of the Republic of Indonesia from 27 October 2014 until 20 October 2019. She is an ophthalmologist and lecturer in the Faculty of Medicine, University of Indonesia.

Career
Moeloek has participated in the selection for the Minister of Health on 18 October 2009, but instead she was appointed as the Representative of Indonesia to Millennium Development Goals (MDGs) by President Susilo Bambang Yudhoyono.

References

1949 births
Living people
Indonesian Muslims
People from Jakarta
Government ministers of Indonesia
University of Indonesia alumni
Health ministers of Indonesia
Indonesian ophthalmologists
Women government ministers of Indonesia
Indonesian women physicians
21st-century Indonesian women politicians
21st-century Indonesian politicians
Working Cabinet (Joko Widodo)